Polže is a small settlement west of Nova Cerkev in the Municipality of Vojnik in eastern Slovenia. The area is part of the traditional region of Styria and is now included in the Savinja Statistical Region.

References

External links
Polže at Geopedia

Populated places in the Municipality of Vojnik